Bonndorf is a town in the Waldshut district in Baden-Württemberg, Germany. It is situated in the southern Black Forest, 14 km southeast of Titisee-Neustadt.

It comprises the villages Boll, Brunnadern, Dillendorf, Ebnet, Gündelwangen, Holzschlag, Wellendingen and Wittlekofen. The town is well known for its Fastnacht festival held on the days before Ash Wednesday. Wellendingen has its Frogs in the parade. Also in the town is a castle, the Japanese Gardens, and a dedicated museum to Fastnacht festives in the area. In Boll is the Wutach Gorge which runs into the Rhine.

Population

Mayors since 1945
 1945: Fritz Göggel
 August 1, 1945: Erwin Leser
 1946–1957: Leo Speck
 1958–1972: Oskar Stöckle
 1973–1992: Peter Folkerts (1946-1992)
 1992–2021: Michael Scharf (born 1964)
 since 2021: Marlon Jost

Personalities

Born in Bonndorf
 Constantin Fehrenbach (1852-1926), politician (center), Reichskanzler 1920–1921

 Adolf Würth (1905-1997), Nazi racist theorist
 Clemens Binninger (born 1962), politician and member of Bundestag (CDU)

Lived in Bonndorf
 Ralf Dahrendorf, Baron Dahrendorf CFE (1929-2009), German-British sociologist, politician and publicist

See also
 List of cities and towns in Germany

References

External links

Waldshut (district)
Baden